Višňová may refer to places in the Czech Republic:

Višňová (Jindřichův Hradec District), a municipality and village in the South Bohemian Region
Višňová (Liberec District), a municipality and village in the Liberec Region
Višňová (Příbram District), a municipality and village in the Central Bohemian Region

See also
Višňové (disambiguation)